Richard Graves (1715–1804) was an English minister, poet, and novelist.

Richard Graves may also refer to:
 Richard Graves (theologian) (1763–1829), Irish theological scholar and priest
 Richard G. Graves (born 1933), American Army general
 Richard Harry Graves (1897–1971), Irish Australian writer
 Richard P. Graves (1906–1989), American businessman
 Richard Perceval Graves (born 1945), English biographer, poet and lecturer